Tubulicium is a genus of fungi in the family Hydnodontaceae. The genus has a widespread distribution, and contains seven species.

References

Trechisporales
Trechisporales genera
Taxa named by Franz Oberwinkler
Taxa described in 1965